Dismorphia eunoe, the Eunoe mimic-white, is a butterfly in the family Pieridae. It is found from Mexico to Central America.

The larvae feed on Inga species, including Inga stenophylla.

Subspecies
The following subspecies are recognised:
D. e. eunoe (Mexico)
D. e. desine (Hewitson, 1869) (Nicaragua to Panama, Costa Rica)
D. e. chamula Llorente & Luis, 1988 (Mexico)
D. e. popoluca Llorente & Luis, 1988 (Mexico)
D. e. noelia Lamas, 2004 (Panama)

References

Dismorphiinae
Butterflies described in 1844